Bandana Kumari is an Indian politician who currently serves as Member of Legislative Assembly for Shalimar Bagh constituency since 2013. She has served as Deputy Speaker of Delhi Legislative Assembly and former president of women's wing of the party, Aam Aadmi Party Mahila Shakti.

Early life
Bandana was born on 11 March 1974 in Samastipur, Bihar in a Bhumihar Brahmin family.  Her father's name is Braj Kishore Sharma. She completed her 12th standard from Ram Briksh Benipuri School, Muzaffarpur in 1991 under the BSE (state) board. Bandana further got the Bachelor of Arts (BA Hons) from B. R. Ambedkar Bihar University, Muzzaffarpur in 1994. Her husband's name is Sajjan Kumar, who is from Bathna, Muzaffarpur. Both of them were self-employed as per 2013 affidavit. She is presently a housewife  and a social worker. She is a resident of Shalimar Bagh, Delhi with her husband and son.

Personal life
Bandana married to Sajjan Kumar, who is from Bathna, Muzaffarpur. Both of them were self-employed as per 2013 affidavit. She is presently a housewife and a social worker. She is a resident of Shalimar Bagh, Delhi with her husband and son, who returned from New York city, United States after completing education.

Political Carrier
In the assembly elections of December 2013, Bandana Kumari was elected as an MLA from the Shalimar Bagh constituency in Delhi, defeated three-time sitting MLA, Ravinder Nath Bansal of Bhartiya Janta Party (BJP) by a margin of 10,651 votes; she secured 47,235 votes. She was instantly hailed as a "giant killer". Bandana's victory was considered a shocking defeat for the BJP as the constituency was traditionally considered to be a stronghold of the party. The constituency was with the BJP since 1993. Shalimar Bagh was also the constituency of BJP's chief minister Sahib Singh Verma in 1993 and Bansal had held the seat for 15 years.

Bandana became President of Aam Aadmi Party (AAP) Mahila Shakti, the AAP's women's wing. She raised issues of women's safety in the city. The AAP's women's wing and Youth wing started 22 Gramin Sewa vehicles for females and senior citizens from Delhi metro stations in December 2014 to address Women's safety and woo women voters. Bandana was renominated for Shalimar Bagh in the 2015 Delhi Legislative Assembly elections. She fought the election on issues of women's safety and corruption.

Bandana won over BJP's Rekha Gupta, the Standing Committee Deputy Chairman New Delhi Municipal Council (NDMC), by a victory margin of 10,978 votes. She also got higher votes (62,656) than 2013 elections.

The AAP won 67 of the 70 seats in Delhi. It announced on 12 February 2015 that Bandana Kumari would be its nominee for the deputy Speaker of the Sixth Legislative Assembly of Delhi. On 23 February, she was formally elected as deputy Speaker; while Ram Niwas Goel became the speaker.

Electoral performance

References 
 

Delhi MLAs 2013–2015
Living people
1974 births
Women members of the Delhi Legislative Assembly
Delhi MLAs 2015–2020
Delhi MLAs 2020–2025
Deputy Speakers of the Delhi Legislative Assembly
People from Samastipur
21st-century Indian women politicians
21st-century Indian politicians
Aam Aadmi Party MLAs from Delhi